The Urban Spotlight Arcade is located at Central Park, Cianjin District, Kaohsiung, Taiwan. It spans from the roundabout of Wu-Fu 3rd Road and Chung-Hua Road to the intersection of Wu-Fu 3rd Road and Chung-Shan road. It is famous for its light decoration in the evening.

History
The arcade was constructed in 2001 with a series of lighting along the pedestrian and rebuilt in 2014 with the addition of art and performance spaces.

Transportation
The venue is accessible from Central Park Station of Kaohsiung MRT.

See also
 List of tourist attractions in Taiwan

References

2001 establishments in Taiwan
Buildings and structures completed in 2001
Buildings and structures in Kaohsiung
Tourist attractions in Kaohsiung